Dermomurex elizabethae is a species of sea snail, a marine gastropod mollusk in the family Muricidae, the murex snails or rock snails.

Description
The length of the shell varies between 10 mm and 20 mm.

Distribution
This species occurs in the Gulf of Mexico, the Caribbean Sea and the Lesser Antilles; in the Atlantic Ocean off the Bermudas.

References

 Rosenberg, G., F. Moretzsohn, and E. F. García. 2009. Gastropoda (Mollusca) of the Gulf of Mexico, pp. 579–699 in Felder, D.L. and D.K. Camp (eds.), Gulf of Mexico–Origins, Waters, and Biota. Biodiversity. Texas A&M Press, College Station, Texas

External links
 

Gastropods described in 1940
Dermomurex